Maczuga Herkulesa is a tall (30 meters) limestone stack situated in Ojców National Park near Pieskowa Skała, north of Kraków in southern Poland. Its name, in Polish, means the "cudgel (or bludgeon) of Hercules", due to its distinctive shape.

Karst topography of soluble bedrock characterizes the entire park. The area is noted for its rock formations, although Maczuga Herkulesa may be the most famous. Apart from limestone monadnocks, there are numerous cliffs, ravines, and over 400 caves in the area.

References 

 The Board of Polish National Parks
 Ojcowski National Park at Polish National Parks by Zbigniew Zwolińsky
 Official website
 Tourist Information of Ojcow National Park

Rock formations of Poland
Geology of Poland
Karst formations
Kraków County